Sergey Bolshakov (born 6 June 1988, Izhevsk) is a Russian professional swimmer, specialising in Open water swimming. He won the bronze medal in the 10 km open water marathon at the 2011 World Championships.  He competed at the 2012 Summer Olympics.

He took up swimming at the age of nine in his home town, after being encouraged to do so by his mother, who was also a swimmer.  He competes for the Central Army Sports Club (CSKA).  Since 2010, his coach has been Elena Nurgaleyeva.  He made his international debut for Russia in 2007.

References

Russian male swimmers
1988 births
Living people
Olympic swimmers of Russia
Swimmers at the 2012 Summer Olympics
World Aquatics Championships medalists in open water swimming
Sportspeople from Izhevsk
20th-century Russian people
21st-century Russian people